CKWY-FM is a Canadian radio station that broadcasts a CHR/Top 40 format at 93.7 FM in Wainwright, Alberta. The station is branded as Hot 93.7 and is owned Stingray Group.

On January 30, 2004, Newcap was given approval from the CRTC operate a new English-language FM radio station in Wainwright. The station began broadcasting on January 31, 2005 at 7 AM with a classic hits format as 93.7 Wayne FM.

On November 7, 2012, Newcap applied to decrease CKWY's signal from 100,000 watts to 50,000 watts, with its antenna height above average terrain (EHAAT) increased from 167.0 metres to 169.5 metres. This application was approved on April 23, 2013.

On October 7, 2019, CKWY rebranded to Hot 93.7 and changed its format to CHR/Top 40.

References

External links
Hot 93.7
 

Kwy
Kwy
Kwy
Radio stations established in 2005
2005 establishments in Alberta